Erica Martrece Wilson (born May 26, 1991 Akron) is an American volleyball player who plays in the German Women's Volleyball League (:de:Championnat d'Allemagne de volley-ball féminin).

Playing career 
She played for Arizona State University.
She participated at the 2015–16 Women's CEV Cup, with Volley Köniz.

Clubs

References

External links 
 http://www.cev.lu/Competition-Area/PlayerDetails.aspx?TeamID=9563&PlayerID=63393&ID=883
 http://www.fivb.org/EN/volleyball/competitions/U23/women/2013/Players.asp?Tourn=WU232013&Team=USA&No=144870
 http://www.scoresway.com/?sport=volleyball&page=player&id=12771
 https://web.archive.org/web/20160619121836/http://www.usc-muenster.de/artikel/erica-wilson-kommt-fuer-die-diagonal-position
 http://www.wn.de/Sport/Lokalsport/Muenster/2396373-Volleyball-Erica-Wilson-soll-Michala-Kvapilova-als-Top-Scorerin-ersetzen-Amerikanische-Power-fuer-den-USC

1991 births
Living people
American women's volleyball players
Sportspeople from Akron, Ohio
Arizona State Sun Devils women's volleyball players
African-American sportswomen
African-American volleyball players
21st-century African-American sportspeople
21st-century African-American women